St. Audoen's Church, Dublin may refer to:

St. Audoen's Church, Dublin (Church of Ireland)
St Audoen's Church, Dublin (Roman Catholic)